The Yoke Kuan High School (SMJKYK or YK) (simplified Chinese: 育群中学; traditional Chinese: 育群中學; pinyin: Yù qún zhōngxué; Malay: Sekolah Menengah Jenis Kebangsaan Yoke Kuan) is a public secondary school in Sekinchan, Sabak Bernam District, Selangor, Malaysia. Founded in 1957, it is the one of the oldest secondary school in the township of Sekinchan. Yoke Kuan High School has historically educated a large number of the local's business leaders and professionals. As an engine for education, Yoke Kuan High School contributes approximately 250 high school graduates annually to the state and the nation.

For the 2017 academic year, there were 230 students enrolled in Form One. At the same year, SMJKYK also has 293 SPM graduates in a number of different streams, including business, science, arts, and household economy.

History 
This school was officially established on 31 May 1959 with 24 pupils and 4 teachers as an attached class in Yoke Kuan Primary School. The establishment of Yoke Kuan High School was founded following the efforts of a local leader, the late Mr. Fu Gim. A committee of "school development" was established in 1960 lead by Mr. Fu Gim successfully fundraised a fund of RM 12188.30. The construction was started and completed the following year. In 1961, with the completion of the first phase of construction, Yoke Kuan High School has it own campus with 6 classrooms, 1 science lab, and 7 teacher's hostel rooms. The number of student has increased to 106. Yoke Kuan has officially changed its name from "Yoke Kuan Secondary School Sekinchan" to "Yoke Kuan National Type Secondary School, Sekinchan" (SMJK Yoke Kuan, Sekinchan) and received full education subsidy from government following the Chinese Independent School Restructuring Plan. In 1963, the first batch of Form 3 students took the L.C.E (Malaysia Lower Certificate of Education) examination. After 10 years of planning, high school class was opened for the public to register and Form 4 was started at the beginning of year 1973. In 1974, the first batch of Form 5 students took the M.C.E (Malaysia Certificate of Education) Examination. The modern Yoke Kuan school campus has consisted of 5 phase of building construction, which initiated from year 1960 with first phase until completed Ninth Malaysia Plan classrooms' building construction in year 2010. This school known as "Yoke Kuan Secondary School" namely "Sekolah Menengah Jenis Kebangsaan Yoke Kuan". This school aged more 50 years and only secondary school found in Sekinchan town and accommodate those students found in this around the area.

The project of building a new school block, Hall, Auditorium was launched in April 2018.  The project is estimated to be completed in a few years. Estimated RM7,000,000 is needed for the construction project.

Extracurricular 
SMJK Yoke Kuan is well known in sports competition especially in Basketball and Gymnastics

Future development 
The project of building a new school block, Hall, Auditorium was launched in April 2018.  The project is estimated to be completed in a few years. Estimated RM7,000,000 is needed for the construction project

References

Secondary schools in Malaysia
Schools in Selangor